Abdesslem Bouchouareb (born 10 December 1997) is an Algerian professional footballer who plays for USM Alger in the Algerian Ligue Professionnelle 1.

Career
In 2022, Bouchouareb signed a two-year contract with USM Alger.

References

External links
 

Living people
1997 births
Algerian footballers
Association football midfielders
AS Aïn M'lila players
AS Khroub players
NC Magra players
USM Alger players